Pseudopostega frigida is a moth of the family Opostegidae. It was described by Edward Meyrick in 1906. It is known from Sri Lanka.

Adults have been recorded in February.

References

Opostegidae
Moths described in 1906